A fellowship hall is a large room or suite in a church building where certain activities in the church building are done, such as certain dinners, breakfasts, meetings, workshops, etc. It gets its name from the fact that the people there at the church building are giving fellowship. Many fellowship halls are multi-purpose rooms and contain recreation facilities such as a basketball court or indoor soccer field. These facilities are also used for wedding receptions, other family functions for church members and certain community events.

See also
Church hall

Church architecture